Cyrioides elateroides  is a species of beetle in the family Buprestidae native to southwest Western Australia. It was described by the English entomologist Edward Saunders in 1872, the type specimen collected along the Swan River. Saunders noted it to be similar in coloration to the related C. vittigera but had its markings were patterned differently.

References

Buprestidae
Beetles described in 1872
Taxa named by Edward Saunders (entomologist)